The SchoolsCompany Trust was a multi-academy trust with academies in Devon and Kent. It was closed in June 2018.

During its existence it was subjected to multiple criticisms: financial irregularities, mis-reporting of attendance, and safeguarding issues in Keystage 4 and Keystage 2.

Schools
Central Devon Academy

Goodwin Academy

References

Multi-academy trusts